Stéphane Martine (born 5 March 1978) is a French footballer, playing as a striker.

Club career
He currently plays in Luxembourg for Racing FC Union Luxembourg, having previously played for F91 Dudelange.

International career
He was born in French Guiana, and represents the région's national team at international level.

Honours
Luxembourg National Division: 3
 2005, 2006, 2007

Luxembourg Cup: 3
 2004, 2006, 2007

Luxembourgian Footballer of the Year: 1
 2005

External links
Biography
weltfussball 
Player profile - RFC Union

1978 births
Living people
French Guianan footballers
French Guiana international footballers
French footballers
CS Sedan Ardennes players
R. Charleroi S.C. players
F91 Dudelange players
Racing FC Union Luxembourg players
Expatriate footballers in Luxembourg
R.E. Virton players
Association football forwards
People from Saint-Laurent-du-Maroni